The Ngurrara and Ngururrpa are overlapping groupings of Aboriginal Australian peoples of the Great Sandy Desert, in the central Pilbara and southern Kimberley regions of Western Australia.  Both groups are represented by various Aboriginal corporations which look after their native title interests.

Name
The ethnonym Ngurrara signifies "home". Ngururrpa means "our country in the middle".

Country and people
The word Ngurrara refers to their native country, properly called Mawurritjiyi, the word for the Tanami Desert.

The Ngurrara comprise the Walmajarri, Wangkatjunga (aka Martu Wangka), Mangala and Juwaliny (a dialect of Walmajarri) language groups.

Peoples of the Walmajarri, Wangkatjunga, Ngarti and Kukatja language groups have called their country Ngururrpa.

Native title

Ngurrara
They presented their case by drawing a large painting of their land, Ngurrara, inscribed with figures from their mythological history associated with various points. Their land is under the custodianship of the Yanunijarra Aboriginal Corporation.

There are several other native title claims under the Ngurrara name, some overlapping or shared with other groups, such as the Martu people.

Ngurra Kayanta (Aboriginal Corporation) RNTBC is the trustee for this land.

Ngururrpa 
Ngururrpa is the name used for a native title claim to land in the Great Sandy Desert, nearer the border with the Northern Territory. The Parna Ngururrpa (Aboriginal Corporation) is the RNTBC which acts as the trustee for the land.

Indigenous Protected Areas

The IPA comprises the whole of the 2007 Ngururrpa Native Title Determination.

See also
Ngarluma language

References

Sources

Aboriginal peoples of Western Australia
Kimberley (Western Australia)
Pilbara